People's Artist of Uzbekistan is an honorary title of the Republic of Uzbekistan. It is presented to the prominent artists of theatre, music, film, pop music, circus, TV and radio broadcast who contributed to the development of the art in the republic.

References